The Women's Super-G in the 2019 FIS Alpine Skiing World Cup involved 6 events, including the finals in Soldeu, Andorra. Originally, the season had been planned to hold 8 events, but the two races scheduled in Sochi, Russia were cancelled due to continuing heavy snowfall. 

Mikaela Shiffrin from the United States generally specialized in the technical disciplines (slalom and giant slalom), not in the speed disciplines (downhill and Super-G), but she jumped out to an early lead in Super-G by winning both of the first two races.  Ultimately, Shiffrin only entered four of the six races held in the discipline (and had not entered the two cancelled races planned for Sochi), but her results in the completed races – 3 victories and a tie for fourth – were sufficient to win the discipline crystal globe for the season over two-time defending champion Tina Weirather of Liechtenstein (who needed to win the finals but did not finish). The win was Shiffrin's tenth discipline championship, but her first in a speed discipline.

The season was interrupted by the 2019 World Ski Championships, which were held from 4–17 February in Åre, Sweden. The women's Super-G was held on 5 February (and was also won by Shiffrin).

Standings

DNF = Did Not Finish
DNS = Did Not Start

See also
 2019 Alpine Skiing World Cup – Women's summary rankings
 2019 Alpine Skiing World Cup – Women's Overall
 2019 Alpine Skiing World Cup – Women's Downhill
 2019 Alpine Skiing World Cup – Women's Giant Slalom
 2019 Alpine Skiing World Cup – Women's Slalom
 2019 Alpine Skiing World Cup – Women's Combined

References

External links
 Alpine Skiing at FIS website

Women's Super-G
FIS Alpine Ski World Cup women's Super-G discipline titles